Senator Durham may refer to:

Israel Wilson Durham (1855–1909), Pennsylvania State Senate
Steven J. Durham (fl. 1970s–2010s), Colorado State Senate